Claes-Göran may refer to:

Claes-Göran Brandin (born 1948), Swedish politician
Claes-Göran Cederlund (born 1948), Swedish physician and birdwatcher
Claes-Göran Fant (born 1951), Swedish Army lieutenant general
Claes-Göran Granqvist (born 1946), Swedish physicist
Claes-Göran Hedén (born 1944), Swedish Coastal Artillery brigadier general

Swedish masculine given names